may refer to:
 Obama Castle (Fukui), the castle from which the Obama Domain was governed
 Obama Castle (Mutsu), a mountain castle in the former Mutsu Province in Japan